The La Playa Hotel, also known as the "Grande Dame of Carmel," is a historic two-story hotel in Carmel-by-the-Sea, California, once owned by artist Chris Jorgensen. The building is an example of Mediterranean Revival architecture. The building qualified as an important commercial building and was registered with the California Register of Historical Resources on September 21, 2002.

History

The La Playa Hotel, dates to 1905 when artist Chris Jorgensen (1860-1935) built a two-story wood-framed, ell shaped stone mansion on the southwest corner of El Camino Real and 8th Avenue, in Carmel-by-the-Sea, California. The home was a gift to his wife, Angela Ghirardelli (1859-1936), heiress to the Ghirardelli Chocolate fortune. The original part of the building was a stone tower with a quatrefoil window, on the north-east side, designed by Jorgensen and built by master stonemason Ben Turner. The upper floor had a wood railing between the stone columns that supported a low-pitched hipped roof. The property had the first swimming pool in Carmel.

On August 17, 1909, Angela's niece, artist Alida Ghirardelli (1878-1909), drowned while swimming in the Carmel Bay. Soon after her death, Jorgensen leased the house to hotelier Agnes "Alice" D. Signor. Jorgensen and his wife left Carmel to live with an art colony in Yosemite National Park.

In 1913, Signor opened the Chris Jorgensen studio to the public under the name of Hotel La Playa (the word beach comes from the Spanish "playa”). Lathe hotel had four bedrooms, a bath, a sitting room, and a kitchen. Signor bought the property in 1916 and converted it into a boarding house called "The Strand." In October 1917, Ralph C. Harrison and his wife (Ella Spencer Reid) visited Carmel and stayed at the hotel for a few weeks. During this visit they bought the block between Camino Real and Casanova Street, south of Ninth Avenue.

Mansion to Hotel

In 1922, Signor added twenty new rooms making it into a full-service hotel. Her nephew and assistant, Harrison Godwin helped to celebrate the ninth anniversary of La Play's opening. 125 people were at the celebration with music by Moffit's Orchestra. In 1923, Signor suffered a stroke, which left her paralyzed. Shortly before her death, she transferred ownership of La Playa to her nephews: Frederick "Fred" MacKaye Godwin and his brother Harrison Godwin. Fred Godwin had a brief film career in the late-1920s. He starred in the silent film Girl Overboard (1928), also known under the title "Port of Dreams".  

In December 1924, the La Playa Hotel was almost destroyed by a fire that started in one of the rooms on the second floor when a stovepipe collapsed. The loss was estimated from $25,000 to $40,000.

The Godwin's rebuilt the hotel with Michael J. Murphy as the contractor in 1925. They added an additional 30-rooms to the south wing, steam heat and private baths. The original entrance and lobby were reconstructed. Fred Godwin went on to mayor of Carmel from 1946 to 1950. On May 31, 1925, the reopening of the new La Playa was the social event of the week. A dinner dance was announced on June 6, 1925, with 200 friends of the Godwin's. Among the quests were ex-Mayor William T. Kibbler, S. F. B. Morse, John Northern Hilliard, and writer James Hopper.

Hotel expansion

Fred Godwin bought out his brother in 1940, and became the sole owner of the hotel. Harrison went into real estate and became sales manager for Del Monte Properties Company. With designer Jon Konigshofer, Godwin completed a major Spanish Revival style remodel. They expanded the hotel into 80-rooms with a terrace dining room overlooking Carmel Bay. In 1952, the hotel got a liquor license and Konigshofer built the Lanai Room cocktail lounge.

The hotel was purchased by Howard E. Allen in 1968 and underwent changes that included a full-time bar and sprinkler system. A full renovation of the hotel occurred in 1983–84, when the Cope family, owners of San Francisco's Huntington Hotel, purchased the hotel and completed a $5 million renovation, which included an upgrade and expansion to the surrounding gardens and landscaping. In 1983, Steve Jobs had a Apple development team retreat at the La Playa hotel and unveiled the Macintosh computer prototype during the retreat. He christened the computer with a bottle of La Playa water.

In 1992, the hotel became a member of the Historic Hotels of America and is currently one of nine hotels in California recognized by the National Trust for Historic Preservation for its architectural quality, historic character, and sensitive rehabilitation. The hotel was registered with the California Register of Historical Resources on September 21, 2002. It qualifies under the California Register criterion 1, in history as one of the earliest remaining  artists’ studios in Carmel, and one of the most notable hotels in the history of Carmel. It is also significant under criterion 3, in the area of architecture as one of the few artist designed studio buildings remaining in Carmel, and an example of the early work of stonemason Ben Turner.

In July 2012, the Grossman Company Properties and Classic Hotels & Resorts reopened the hotel after a $3.5 million renovation. Classic Hotels & Resorts has a strong record of restoring properties. The hotel was renamed "La Playa Carmel" in 2012.

See also
List of hotels in the United States
List of mayors of Carmel-by-the-Sea, California

References

External links

 Official website
 Downtown Conservation District Historic Property Survey
 Lanai Room - La Playa Hotel
 Monterey Peninsula The Golden Age
 California's Haunted Central Coast

1905 establishments in California
Carmel-by-the-Sea, California
Buildings and structures in Monterey County, California